The Dominion of Sierra Leone was a sovereign state with Queen Elizabeth II as its head of state between independence on 27 April 1961 and becoming the Republic of Sierra Leone on 19 April 1971.

When British rule ended in April 1961, the British Crown Colony of Sierra Leone was given independence under the Sierra Leone Independence Act 1961. Elizabeth II, remained the head of state of Sierra Leone and was represented in Sierra Leone by a Governor-General. Sierra Leone shared the Sovereign with other countries, including the United Kingdom.

History
On 27 April 1961 Sierra Leone gained independence.

In 1962 general elections were won by the Sierra Leone People's Party (SLPP). The All People's Congress (APC) emerged as the most organised opposition.

In March 1964 Njala University opened. On 28 April 1964 Prime Minister Milton Margai died. His brother, Albert Margai, was appointed as new prime minister. On 4 August 1964 Sierra Leone currency, the Sierra Leonean leone, was established.

In 1967 general elections were held in Sierra Leone. The APC won by a narrow margin. Brigadier John Lansana, head of the military, seized control of government immediately after swearing in of the new APC prime minister, Siaka Stevens. Lansana was ousted a few days later by junior military officers who invited Andrew Juxon-Smith, a senior officer on leave, to return and head a provisional government, the National Reformation Council (NRC).

In 1968 NRC was overthrown by warrant officers of the army. John Bangura, a formerly dismissed senior officer, invited to head the army. Bangura turned over government to the APC, led by Siaka Stevens.

In 1969 University of Sierra Leone was set up, comprising Fourah Bay College and Njala University.

On 19 April 1971 Sierra Leone became a republic with Siaka Stevens as executive president.

Governors-General
The Governors-General of Sierra Leone were:

Sir Maurice Henry Dorman (27 April 1961 – 27 April 1962)
Sir Henry Josiah Lightfoot Boston (27 April 1962 – April 1967)
Andrew Juxon-Smith (April 1967 – 18 April 1968) (acting)
John Amadu Bangura (18–22 April 1968) (acting)
Sir Banja Tejan-Sie (22 April 1968 – 31 March 1971)
Christopher Okoro Cole (31 March – 19 April 1971) (interim)

Prime Ministers
The Prime Ministers (and heads of government) of Sierra Leone during this period were:

Milton Margai (27 April 1961 – 30 April 1964)
Albert Margai (30 April 1964 – 17 March 1967)
Siaka Stevens (first term) (17 March 1967 – 21 March 1967)
David Lansana (21 March 1967 – 24 March 1967)
Ambrose Patrick Genda (24 March 1967 – 27 March 1967)a
Andrew Juxon Smith (27 March 1967 – 19 April 1968)a
Patrick Conteh (19 April 1968 – 26 April 1968)b
Siaka Stevens (second term) (26 April 1968 – 19 April 1971)

Transition to a Republic

Elizabeth II visited Sierra Leone from 25 November to 1 December 1961, shortly after independence.

Sierra Leone became a republic within the Commonwealth on the promulgation of the 1971 constitution and Prime Minister Siaka Stevens became the first President of Sierra Leone.

See also 
 Elizabeth II, Queen of Sierra Leone
 Medals of Sierra Leone (1961–1971)

References

Bibliography

Notes

External links 

1961 establishments in Sierra Leone
1971 disestablishments in Sierra Leone
Former Commonwealth realms
Government of Sierra Leone
History of Sierra Leone
Politics of Sierra Leone
Sierra Leone and the Commonwealth of Nations
Sierra Leone–United Kingdom relations
States and territories established in 1961
States and territories disestablished in 1971